Noah and Hannah Hadley Kellum House is a historic home located in Guilford Township, Hendricks County, Indiana.  It was built in 1872, and is a two-story I-house with a rear ell and Greek Revival and Italianate style design elements.  It has a gable roof, segmental arched openings, and sits on a brick foundation.  Also on the property are the contributing English barn and shed.

It was added to the National Register of Historic Places in 1995.

References

Houses on the National Register of Historic Places in Indiana
Greek Revival houses in Indiana
Italianate architecture in Indiana
Houses completed in 1872
National Register of Historic Places in Hendricks County, Indiana
Buildings and structures in Hendricks County, Indiana